18 Seventeenth Avenue is a historic house located at the address of the same name in Sea Cliff, Nassau County, New York.

Description and history 
It was built in about 1890 by Combs & Pearsall, and is a two-story, clapboard sided, Queen Anne style residence with a cross-gabled roof. It features a three-story square tower with a pyramidal roof with overhanging eaves supported by decorative scroll sawn brackets.

It was listed on the National Register of Historic Places on February 18, 1988.

References

Houses on the National Register of Historic Places in New York (state)
Queen Anne architecture in New York (state)
Houses completed in 1890
Houses in Nassau County, New York
National Register of Historic Places in Nassau County, New York